Surbiton railway station is a National Rail station in Surbiton, south-west London, in the Royal Borough of Kingston upon Thames. The station is managed and served by South Western Railway, and is in Travelcard Zone 6.

It has been considered one of the finest modernist stations in Great Britain and is a Grade II listed building.

History

The Hampton Court Branch was built in 1849, the New Guildford Line which diverges at the same point opened in 1885.

Successive renamings of the station were Kingston Junction in late 1852, Surbiton and Kingston in 1863 when the present Kingston railway station opened on the branch line, and Surbiton in 1867. The station was completely rebuilt in 1937 by the Southern Railway with two island platforms with Southern Railway designed canopies. The buildings were designed by James Robb Scott in an art deco style. In 1984/85 a large mural titled 'Passengers' was painted in the booking hall by artist Graeme Willson. It has since been removed.

The station had a moderately sized goods yard which was situated on the eastern side of the station platforms. Two additional sidings were located on the western 'up' side of the station and were served by a short loading platform. In addition to local goods facilities, the main yard was also used as the loading point for the short lived Surbiton – Okehampton car carrier service that ran between 1960 and 1964.

The main goods yard finally closed in 1971 with all localised freight operations then being moved to the nearby goods yard at Tolworth on the Chessington branch. The former goods yard site at Surbiton ultimately became the main station car park although some land was also subsequently developed into residential flats.

One of the two 'up' sidings remains in place and still sees occasional use with civil engineering stock.

A major incident occurred on 4 July 1971 when a freight train derailed on the points at the London end of platforms 3 & 4. Unaware of the incident, the driver continued through the station with the result that two derailed wagons eventually toppled over south of the platforms and obstructed the down fast through line. At the same time, a down express passed through the station and collided with the derailed wagons at a speed that caused the front of the express to derail and topple over. The leading coach finally came to rest as it struck the road bridge that passes under the line south of the station. There were no fatalities and the cause of the initial derailment was eventually attributed to overloading of some of the ballast wagons in the freight train which resulted in buffer locking when the train initially left Clapham Junction yard that day.

The front ticket office at Surbiton is open seven days a week.

Services
South Western Railway operate all services at Surbiton using Class 450 and 455 EMUs. Until 2022, Class 456 trains were often attached to the latter to form ten carriage trains, but these units were withdrawn on 17th January with the introduction of a new timetable. 
 
The station is served by both inner and outer suburban South Western Railway services.

The typical off-peak service in trains per hour is:
 4 tph to London Waterloo (semi-fast)
2 tph to London Waterloo (all stations)
 2 tph to 
 2 tph to  via Cobham & Stoke d'Abernon

Due to the COVID-19 pandemic, the fast services to London Waterloo, Alton and Basingstoke are currently reduced to 1 tph each.

Platforms

The station has four platforms on two islands, all of which can be accessed by 12 carriage trains.

Platform 1: for most services to London Waterloo.
Platform 2: for some services to London Waterloo, mostly in the early morning and late evening. Non-stopping up trains use its track.
Platform 3: for trains to Basingstoke and the Alton Line.
Platform 4 is for trains to Woking, the Hampton Court Branch and the New Guildford Line
An additional track for non-stopping down trains lies between Platforms 2 and 3.

Connections
London Buses routes 71, 281, 465, K1, K2, K3 and K4 and non-TFL routes 514 and 515 serve the station.

Appearances in media
The station was used for filming of Harry Potter and the Half-Blood Prince in October 2007.

Surbiton station also appears in Agatha Christie's Poirot: "The Adventure of the Clapham Cook", a TV adaptation of the short story by Agatha Christie and the first episode of the 1989 ITV series. Having been set in the 1930s Art Deco period and external shots of Hercule Poirot's fictional residence Whitehaven Mansions being filmed at Florin Court, the station assists in maintaining the authenticity of the programme and was built within a year of Florin Court.

Notes

References

External links

London Transport Museum: Kingston – The growth of London through transport – with 1875 map

Art Deco architecture in London
Railway stations in the Royal Borough of Kingston upon Thames
Railway stations in Great Britain opened in 1845
Former London and South Western Railway stations
Railway stations served by South Western Railway
Art Deco railway stations
Railway station
James Robb Scott buildings
Grade II listed buildings in the Royal Borough of Kingston upon Thames
Grade II listed railway stations
Modernist architecture in London